"Cover My Eyes (Pain and Heaven)" is the lead single from the 1991 album Holidays in Eden by British neo-progressive rock band Marillion. A straightforward pop song, it peaked at number 34 on the UK Singles Chart, but reached number 14 in the Netherlands, becoming the band's biggest hit there since "Kayleigh" (1985). The band performed on Top of the Pops on 6 June 1991, despite the song at the time being outside the top 40.

The B-side was the non-album track "How Can It Hurt". The 12-inch vinyl and 5-inch CD single included exactly the same tracks as the 7-inch and cassette single plus another track from Holidays in Eden, "The Party".

A Mexican promo was released with the Spanish title "Cubro Mis Ojos".

Track listings
7-inch and cassette version
A. "Cover My Eyes (Pain and Heaven)" – 3:52
B. "How Can It Hurt" – 4:10

12-inch version
A1. "Cover My Eyes (Pain and Heaven)" – 3:48
B1. "How Can It Hurt" – 4:10
B2. "The Party" – 5:36

5-inch CD single
 "Cover My Eyes (Pain and Heaven)" – 3:48
 "How Can It Hurt" – 4:10
 "The Party" – 5:36

Personnel
 Steve Hogarth – vocals
 Steve Rothery – guitars
 Mark Kelly – keyboards
 Pete Trewavas – bass
 Ian Mosley – drums

Charts

References

Marillion songs
1991 singles
1991 songs
Song recordings produced by Christopher Neil
EMI Records singles
Songs written by Steve Rothery
Songs written by Steve Hogarth
Songs written by Mark Kelly (keyboardist)
Songs written by Ian Mosley
Songs written by Pete Trewavas
Music videos directed by Howard Greenhalgh